Leucoptera aceris is a moth in the family Lyonetiidae. It is found from Latvia to the Pyrenees, Alps and Bulgaria. It has also been recorded from Portugal.

The larvae feed on Acer campestre, Acer monspessulanum and Acer platanoides. They mine the leaves of their host plant. The mine consists of a small, upper-surface blotch with frass concentrated in a central spot. Pupation takes place outside of the mine.

References

Leucoptera (moth)
Moths described in 1903
Moths of Europe